Five ships of the Royal Navy have borne the name HMS Sentinel:

  was a 12-gun brig, formerly named Friendship.  She was purchased in 1804 and wrecked in the Baltic in 1812.
  was a  scout cruiser launched in 1904 and sold in 1923.
 HMS Sentinel was an S-class destroyer, renamed  before being launched in 1942.
  was an S-class submarine launched in 1945 and scrapped in 1962.
  was a patrol vessel purchased in 1983. She was previously named Seaforth Warrior and Edda Sun. She was commissioned in 1984 and paid off in 1992. She was sold in 1993.

Royal Navy ship names